The following is a list of events affecting Canadian television in 2019. Events listed include television show debuts, finales, cancellations, and channel launches, closures and rebrandings.

Events

Television programs

Programs debuting in 2019
Series currently listed here have been announced by their respective networks as scheduled to premiere in 2019. Note that shows may be delayed or cancelled by the network between now and their scheduled air dates.

Programs ending in 2019

Television films

Networks and services

Network conversions and rebrandings

Network closures

See also
 2019 in Canada
 List of Canadian films of 2019
 List of most watched Canadian television broadcasts of 2019

References